Malkhaz Arziani (15 August 1964 – 22 June 2022) was a Georgian footballer. He is the father of Zurab Arziani.

Malkhaz Arziani spent eight seasons in the Soviet Top League as a leftback between 1982 and 1990, followed by four successive seasons in Umaglesi Liga at Dinamo Tbilisi. 

He played his only cap for Georgia against Azerbaijan in September 1992. But at that time Azerbaijan was not a member of FIFA nor UEFA, so the match does not regard as official match.

References

External links

Soviet footballers
Footballers from Georgia (country)
Georgia (country) international footballers
Expatriate footballers from Georgia (country)
FC Dinamo Tbilisi players
Expatriate footballers in Sweden
Association football midfielders
1964 births
Living people
FC Guria Lanchkhuti players
FC Dinamo Batumi players
Soviet Top League players
Expatriate sportspeople from Georgia (country) in Sweden